Irene Rich Dramas is a title applied to several radio dramatic anthology programs in the United States, some of which had other distinct titles as indicated below. The program was heard on the Blue Network from October 4, 1933 until May 31, 1942, and on CBS from June 5, 1942 until May 28, 1944.

As the title indicates, the programs featured actress Irene Rich, who ventured into radio after encountering a problem with Warner Bros. film studio. Rich's entry on the Encyclopædia Britannica'''s website describes Rich's career as being "in brief doldrums in 1933", when she began the broadcasts.

 Programs 

Talk with Irene Rich
Broadcast on NBC  1933, this program had Rich chatting with announcer Norman Ross about news from Hollywood, some of which had been updated via telegraph immediately preceding the broadcast.It was also known as Hollywood with Irene Rich and Behind the Screen''.

Jewels of Enchantment 
Beginning on May 23, 1934, Rich starred in a serial, portraying titled Englishwoman who went to the South Seas to try to find her missing fiance. On January 4, 1935, the format changed to 15-minute self-contained dramas, often with Gale Gordon as Rich's co-star.

The Lady Counsellor 
Rich portrayed Irene Davis, an attorney, in this 15-minue weekly serial that began on April 24, 1936. Her co-star was Carleton Young in the role of a criminal lawyer who was Davis's suitor as well as her rival.

Untitled dramas 
In the latter half of the 1930s, Rich acted in "one-shot dramas" with Ned Wever as her co-star.

Glorious One 
From January 7, 1940, until September 8, 1940, Rich played Judith Bradley, who returned home after five years in a sanitarium only to find that her husband was the subject of Bradley's friend's amorous pursuits. John Lake played the husband, with Larry Nunn and Florence Baker as their children. Pauline Hopkins was the writer.

Dear John 
Rich played Faith Chandler from September 15, 1940, until January 9, 1944. Others in the cast were Ray Montgomery, Betty Moran, Lois Collier, and Norman Field.

Woman from Nowhere 
Rich portrayed "an enigmatic woman" from January 16, 1944, to May 28, 1944. Her character, Eve Hathaway, was a magazine editor who was recovering from amnesia. Herb Allen, Bill Johnstone, and Anne Sloane filled supporting roles.
Gerald Mohr was the narrator, and Marvin Miller was the announcer. Ry-Krisp was the sponsor.

References 

American radio dramas
1930s American radio programs
1940s American radio programs
CBS Radio programs
NBC Blue Network radio programs